Al-Shabab Football Club, or The Youth Football Club, in English, is a Saudi Arabian professional football club based in Riyadh. It was founded in 1947, and was at first named Shabab Al Riyadh., meaning Riyadhi Youth, but in 1967 was renamed Al Shabab.

History
Al Shabab was the First football club in Riyadh. The club began before 1947, with many conflicts before with its numerous members, but it was settled in 1947 and Abdulrahman Bin Saeed was the president. Five years later, Al Shabab won its first tournament beating Sakit Al Hadeed (Railway Club) in Riyadh. Three years later, in 1955 Al Shabab beat the Military College to win the King Saud Cup. Two years passed, and a new conflict arose in 1957. The player, Saleh Jaber, was assigned captain, but then was fired, and the new captain was Ahmed Lmfoon. This did not please some members of the club. Soon the conflict was impossible to solve, and Abdulrahman Bin Saeed and some members, left Al Shabab and took the best players that played for the club back then in an injustice way leaving Al Shabab to a chaos, The club stopped for half a year due to financial weakness, a new football club was born from the conflicts and separation with Abdulrahman Bin Saeed as the president which is the club known today as Al-Hilal. Then in the beginning of 1959 another problem began, Abdullah Bin Ahmed, the president then, was all alone taking care of the club. He couldn't take the pressure of handling the club alone, and decided to take a vacation abroad. Before traveling, he disbanded the first team, and most of the players signed for other clubs mainly Al-Ahli and Al-Hilal. What was left was the youth team, and the player Abdulrahman Bin Ahmed decided to take care of the youth, and from that they got there name Shabab Al Riyadh which means Riyadh's youth. Soon Abdullah Bin Ahmed returned, and many members returned and supported the club. Then Abdullah Bin Ahmed announced the return of forming the first team, and some players returned, but some stayed at Al-Ahli and Al-Hilal. Also in 1959 was the formation of the Saudi Football Federation, and all football clubs were announced official. In 1960 in the first official tournament called King Saud Cup for the Central Province, Al Shabab faced Al Hilal in their first official games between the two, and won 3–0 to win their first cup.

In the 1960s, everyone wanted to play and be part of the club, and after the request of Al Najmah FC and Al Marekh in 1967, they were united as one club and changed their name from Shabab Riyadh, to simply Al Shabab. The colors of the team were at first white and green, then they were changed after the unification to orange and blue, but in 1977 it was changed to white, gray, and black, the current colors. In 1975 Al Shabab was delegated to the 1st Division. But the next season it was able to win 1st place, and was relegated back to the Premier League in 1976. In 1993, Al Shabab became the first club in Saudi Arabia to win 3 premier leagues in a row. In 2007, Al Shabab became the first club in Saudi Arabia to build projects to increase the club's revenue, and began a 200 million dollar project which contains a 5 star hotel, and a shopping mall. During a visit to the club in January 2008, Al Shabab's main supporter, Khalid bin Sultan, announced the launch of two new projects, Al Laith TV Channel, and Al Shabab Museum.

Achievements

 Saudi Premier League:
 Champion (6): 1990–91, 1991–92, 1992–93, 2003–04, 2005–06, 2011–12
 Runner-up (6): 1981–82, 1984–85, 1988–89, 1997–98, 2004–05, 2020–21
 Saudi King's Cup :
 Champion (3): 2008, 2009, 2014
 Runner-up: 2013
 Crown Prince Cup:
 Champion (3): 1993, 1996, 1999
 Runner-up (4): 1992, 1994, 2000, 2009
 Saudi Super Cup:
 Champion: 2014
 Asian Cup Winners Cup: 
 Champion: 2001
 Arab Champions League:
 Champion (2): 1992, 1999
 Arab Super Cup:
 Champion (2): 1996, 2001
 Gulf Club Champions Cup:
 Champion (2): 1993, 1994
 Saudi First Division (Division 2):
 Champion: 1978–79
 Saudi Federation cup:
 Champion (4): 1988, 1989, 2009, 2010

Records
 First Saudi club to win three Saudi Premier League in a row (1991, 1992, and 1993).
 First Saudi club to win the professional and new Saudi Premier League, in 1991.
 Largest margin win was against Al Shoalah during a friendly tournament in 2007, 8–0. Largest margin win in an official game was against Al-Ta'ee in the Saudi Premier League in 2003, 7–0. Largest margin win against a high-ranked club was 6–1 against Al-Nasr in the Saudi Premier League 2004.

Current squad

{|
|-
| valign="top" |

Unregistered players

{|
|-
| valign="top" |

Out on loan

Management

Current board of directors and Administrators

Current technical staff

Recent seasons
The table below chronicles the achievements of Al Shabab in various competitions since 2000.

Managers

Asian competitions

Overview

Record by country

Asian record

Matches

AFC Club ranking
Rankings are calculated by the AFC

References

External links

 
 نادي الشباب | أخر الأ | NADY ALSHBAB 

 
Association football clubs established in 1947
Football clubs in Saudi Arabia
Sport in Riyadh
1947 establishments in Saudi Arabia
Football clubs in Riyadh
Asian Cup Winners Cup winning clubs